What's Wrong with Bill? is the debut solo studio album by American rapper and record producer Ill Bill. It was released on March 2, 2004 via Psycho+Logical-Records. Recording sessions took place at Powerhouse Studios in New York. Production was handled by Ill Bill himself with his brother Necro, who also served as executive producer. It features guest appearances from Necro, Goretex, Mr. Hyde, Q-Unique, Sabac Red and Uncle Howie.

Track listing

Personnel
 William "Ill Bill" Braunstein – vocals, producer (track 16), co-producer (tracks: 1, 3-5, 9, 11, 14), recording, mixing
 Ron "Necro" Braunstein – vocals (tracks: 4, 8, 10, 16), guitar & bass (track 16), producer, recording, mixing, executive producer
 Mitchell "Goretex" Manzanilla – vocals (tracks: 4, 10, 11)
 Howard "Uncle Howie" Tenenbaum – vocals (track 4)
 Christopher "Mr. Hyde" Catenacci – vocals (track 7)
 Anthony "Q-Unique" Quiles – vocals (track 10)
 John "Sabac Red" Fuentes – vocals (track 11)
 Elliott Thomas – recording, mixing
 Charles De Montebello – mastering
 Michael Lavine – photography
 Emily Optics – photography
 Hobin Choi – photography
 Paul Gulacy – cover

References

External links

Ill Bill albums
2004 debut albums
Psycho+Logical-Records albums